Hassan Rahimi (born 15 June 1989) is an Iranian wrestler. He was born in Tehran, Iran, and grown up in Yaftabad Tehran. In 2008, he became the Junior Asian Champion and Junior World silver medalist. In 2009 he became the Junior World Champion. In 2010 he became Military World Champion. In 2011, he won the bronze medal at the World Championships. In 2012, he became the Asian Champion, but at the 2012 Summer Olympics, he ranked eighth. In 2013 he became World Champion. At the 2014 World Championships he won the bronze medal.

Freestyle Results

References
Profile

External links
 

1989 births
Living people
Iranian male sport wrestlers
Olympic wrestlers of Iran
Wrestlers at the 2012 Summer Olympics
Wrestlers at the 2016 Summer Olympics
Wrestlers at the 2010 Asian Games
Wrestlers at the 2014 Asian Games
Medalists at the 2016 Summer Olympics
Olympic medalists in wrestling
Olympic bronze medalists for Iran
World Wrestling Championships medalists
Asian Games competitors for Iran
Asian Wrestling Championships medalists
People from Zanjan, Iran
21st-century Iranian people
20th-century Iranian people
World Wrestling Champions